Nii Ayikoi Otoo is a Ghanaian lawyer and politician. He belongs to the New Patriotic political party. He served as Attorney General and Minister of Justice of Ghana in the John Agyekum Kufour administration. He is currently Ghana's high commissioner to Canada.

Early life and education
Nii Ayikoi Otoo was born in Mamprobi, a town in the Greater Accra Region of Ghana, to E. K. A. Otoo and Emelia Otoo. He attended Ebenezer Secondary School in Accra and obtained his GCE Ordinary Level certificate. He had to move to Sekondi in the Western Region of Ghana so he could attend Fijai Secondary School. After obtaining his GCE Advanced Level certificate he was admitted to the University of Ghana in 1976 to pursue a degree in law. Upon completion in 1979, Nii Ayikoi Otoo enrolled at the Ghana School of Law. He was called to the Ghana Bar in 1981.

Working life
Lawyer Ayikoi Otoo did his one-year mandatory national service and then sojourned to Nigeria. When he returned to Ghana, he was employed by Adamafio & Associates, a law firm in Accra where he worked for over 20 years. In the early 2000s, he started his own chambers called Otoo & Associates Leo Chambers at Laterbiokorshie in Accra. He served as secretary and later president of the Greater Accra Bar Association. He worked with his learned colleague Nana Akuffo-Addo on the National Council of the Ghana Bar Association.

Political life
Ayikoi Otoo was appointed as the Attorney General and Minister of Justice by President John Agyekum Kufour in 2005 to succeed Papa Owusu-Ankomah. He ended his term as the minister in April 2006 after a ministerial reshuffle. Hon. Joe Ghartey was named in his place.
He was chairman of the Constitutional Committee of the New Patriotic Party in 2010 and was a member of the party's Vetting Committee that vetted the presidential hopefuls for the 2011 primary.
In December 2011 Ga Adamgbe youth petitioned the leadership of the New Patriotic Party to consider making Ayikoi Otoo the running mate to the then Presidential candidate, Nana Addo Danquah Akuffo Addo. Nana Akuffo-Addo eventually settled on Mahamudu Bawumia as his running mate.
In March 2017 President Nana Addo Dankwa Akufo-Addo appointed Ayikoi Otoo as Ghana's High Commissioner to Canada.

Personal life
Ayikoi Otoo is married to Patrica Otoo, with whom he has six children.

References

Living people
Date of birth unknown
Place of birth unknown
Attorneys General of Ghana
20th-century Ghanaian lawyers
Ghana School of Law alumni
High Commissioners of Ghana to Canada
Justice ministers of Ghana
New Patriotic Party politicians
University of Ghana alumni
Year of birth missing (living people)
21st-century Ghanaian lawyers